The 1954 1000 km Buenos Aires was a motor race for sports cars which was held on January 24 at the Autódromo Municipal-Avenida Paz, (Buenos Aires, Argentina). It was the opening race of the 1954 World Sportscar Championship and was also the inaugural 1000 km Buenos Aires. The race was won by Giuseppe Farina and Umberto Maglioli, driving a Ferrari 375 MM

Report

Entry

A grand total 38 racing cars were registered for this event, of which only 36 arrived for practice and qualifying.  This being the first major sports car races of the year, the race was supported by the work of teams of Ferrari and Maserati . Both teams were represented by one car in the race. Ferrari with a 375 MM, which was piloted by Giuseppe Farina and the young Umberto Maglioli. The factory Maserati was piloted Emilio Giletti and Luigi Musso. With Osca came another factory teams from Italy. France was represented by Gordini, and from the UK came Aston Martin’s entered by David Brown with Jaguar prepared and raced by Ecurie Ecosse. Also, the German works team of Borgward took the long journey to Buenos Aires.

Qualifying

Carroll Shelby took pole position for the privateer entry from Roy Cherryhomes team, in their Allard-Cadillac J2X.

Race

The race was held over 106 laps of the 5.888 miles Autódromo Municipal-Avenida Paz, giving a distance of 624.162 miles (1,000 km). In the race, the factory Ferrari won ahead of the privately entered Ferrari 250 MM of Alfonso de Portago and Harry Schell , as well as the Aston Martin DB3S by Peter Collins and Pat Griffith. At the lap 14, car number 42 (private Aston Martin DB3 chassis number one) driven by Greene and Stabile) got under fire and caused death of Eric Forrest Greene.
Car number 10, driven by Farina and Maglioli took an impressive victory, winning in a time of 6hrs 41:50.8 mins., averaging a speed of 93.197mph. Second place went to de Portago and Schell , albeit three laps adrift. The podium was complete by the winner of the 1953 RAC Tourist Trophy, Collins and Griffiths who in turn were a further lap down.

Official Classification

Class Winners are in Bold text.

 Fastest Lap: Giuseppe Farina, 3:34.6secs (98.779 mph)

Class Winners

Standings after the race

Note: Only the top five positions are included in this set of standings.
Championship points were awarded for the first six places in each race in the order of 8-6-4-3-2-1. Manufacturers were only awarded points for their highest finishing car with no points awarded for positions filled by additional cars. Only the best 4 results out of the 6 races could be retained by each manufacturer.

References

1000 km Buenos Aires
1000 km Buenos Aires
Buenos Aires